Toivo Kivimäki's cabinet was the 20th government of Republic of Finland. Cabinet's time period was from December 14, 1932 to October 10, 1936. It was Minority government. Many of the neutral ministers were members of the National Coalition Party without formal support of the party. Cabinet fell in 1936 by the interpellation of the opposition after its bill to reinstate the capital punishment had failed to pass. Kivimäki's cabinet was the longest government in Finland until 1987  Kalevi Sorsa's fourth cabinet.

References

 

Kivimäki
1932 establishments in Finland
1936 disestablishments in Finland
Cabinets established in 1932
Cabinets disestablished in 1936